Erasmus Alberus (c. 15005 May 1553) was a German humanist, Lutheran reformer, and poet.

Life
He was born in the village of Bruchenbrücken (now part of Friedberg, Hesse) about the year 1500. Although his father Tilemann Alber was a schoolmaster, his early education was neglected.
Ultimately in 1518, he found his way to the University of Wittenberg, where he studied theology. He had the good fortune to attract the attention of Martin Luther and Philipp Melanchthon, and subsequently became one of Luther's most active helpers in the Protestant Reformation.

Not only did he fight for the Protestant cause as a preacher and theologian, but he was almost the only member of Luther's party who was able to confront the Roman Catholics with the weapon of literary satire. In 1542 he published a prose satire to which Luther wrote the preface, Der Barfusser Monche Eulenspiegel und Alkoran, a parodic adaptation of the Liber conformitatum of the Franciscan Bartolommeo Rinonico of Pisa, in which the Franciscan order is held up to ridicule. This drew reactions from Catholic scholars such as Henricus Sedulius, who published the Apologeticus aduersus Alcoranum Franciscanorum, pro Libro Conformitatum, which criticized Alberus' arguments in this satire. 

Of higher literary value is the didactic and satirical Buch von der Tugend und Weisheit (1550), a collection of forty-nine fables in which Alberus embodies his views on the relations of Church and State. His satire is incisive, but in a scholarly and humanistic way; it does not appeal to popular passions with the fierce directness which enabled the master of Catholic satire, Thomas Murner, to inflict such telling blows.

Several of Alberus's hymns, all of which show the influence of his master Luther, have been retained in the German Protestant hymnal.

After Luther's death, Alberus was for a time a deacon in Wittenberg; he became involved, however, in the political conflicts of the time, and was in Magdeburg in 1550–1551, while that town was besieged by Maurice, Elector of Saxony. In 1552 he was appointed General Superintendent at Neubrandenburg in Mecklenburg, where he died on 5 May 1553.

Translations
Alberus' Thanksgiving Hymn: To You, O God, Our Thanks We Give, translated by Nathaniel J. Biebert (Red Brick Parsonage, 2014).

References

Attribution:

1500s births
1553 deaths
People from Friedberg, Hesse
German Lutheran theologians
German Lutheran hymnwriters
German Protestant Reformers
University of Wittenberg alumni
German Renaissance humanists
Christian humanists
German male non-fiction writers
16th-century hymnwriters
15th-century Lutheran theologians
16th-century Lutheran theologians